Alex O (born Alex Okoroigwe) is a Nigerian pop musician, singer, songwriter and music producer.  He is best known for his song "Celebrate".

Biography  
Alex O was born in Imo State where he started his music career. Uncle Steve Rhodes as he was known, joined the Lemmy Jackson music company as a production assistant and songwriter. Alex was signed to PolyGram Records, Premier Music of Nigeria in 1988.

Alex O was noticed in the 1990’s after "Celebrate" became a global disco hit.  

Alex O was married to Oby Edozie, a Nigerian film actress and producer.

References

Nigerian male musicians
Living people
21st-century Nigerian male singers
English-language singers from Nigeria
Nigerian music industry executives
Year of birth missing (living people)
Musicians from Imo State